The AWA World Light Heavyweight Championship was a title in the American Wrestling Association (AWA) from 1981 until it closed in 1991. In 1989, the Japan-based Frontier Martial-Arts Wrestling (FMW) promotion began billing Jim Backlund as the champion, something not acknowledged by the AWA. From 1988 through the closure of the AWA in 1991, there were two separate lineages, with the FMW version of the championship being sometimes referred to as the FMW World Light Heavyweight Championship. In 1992, FMW renamed the title to the WWA World Martial Arts Junior Heavyweight Championship before retiring it in 1993.

Title history

Footnotes

See also
Independent World Junior Heavyweight Championship
WSL World Light Heavyweight Championship

References

American Wrestling Association championships
Frontier Martial-Arts Wrestling championships
Light heavyweight wrestling championships